Kawazu may refer to:

Places
Kawazu, Shizuoka, Japan
Kawazu, Amarapura, Burma

Other uses
Kawazu (surname), a Japanese surname